Virginia Tonelli (Castelnovo del Friuli, 13 November 1903 – Trieste, 29 September 1944) was an Italian partisan. She was burned alive by the fascists in the Risiera di San Sabba concentration camp, and was posthumously awarded the Gold Medal of Military Valour.

Biography 
Tonelli was born into a poor family. Her father, a bricklayer, who supported seven children, died of typhus in 1915. Virginia began working as a seamstress and then as a nurse, working in the children's hospital in Venice. In 1930 she joined the Italian Communist Party, which at that time operated in hiding due to the ascendance of fascism.

In 1933 she emigrated to Toulon, France. In 1937 she married Pietro Zampollo, a fellow party member who went to fight in Spain in the International Brigades to support the Republic, where he was wounded, sent back to Italy and imprisoned. In Toulon, Tonelli, having become a revolutionary by profession, hosted several comrades who moved between Italy, France and Spain. Among the best-known of these were Giorgio Amendola, Giuseppe Dozza, Giancarlo Pajetta and Emilio Sereni.

In the early months of 1943, with fascism now in difficulty, the party leadership ordered her to return to Castelnovo to carry out propaganda and protest actions. In one of these, on 14 June, she was arrested, but the fall of the regime returned her to freedom.

With the German occupation following the armistice of 8 September and with the creation of the Italian Social Republic (the Republic of Salò), Tonelli had to go underground, actively engaging in the Italian resistance movement under the nom de guerre of "Luisa". Her task was to disseminate propaganda material and to collect and deliver materials for the support of the partisan formations operating in Veneto and Friuli.

On 19 September 1944, while she was transporting documents from Udine to Trieste with a colleague, Wilma Tominez Padovan, she was arrested and imprisoned by the fascists. She was brutally tortured for ten days to extract information, but to no avail. She was then taken to the Risiera di San Sabba concentration camp and burned alive on 29 September. Her remains were never found. On January 25, 1971, she was posthumously awarded the Gold Medal of Military Valour.

A plaque placed in Castelnovo remembers her with an inscription written by the poet Tito Maniacco:

Honors

Bibliography

References

External links 

1903 births
1944 deaths
Executed Italian women
Female resistance members of World War II
Italian nurses
Italian partisans
People executed by burning
People executed by the Italian Social Republic
People from the Province of Pordenone
Recipients of the Gold Medal of Military Valor
Torture victims
20th-century Italian women
Italian women nurses